Operation Mountain Storm was a military operation carried out on November 7 2007 by special police forces of the Republic of Macedonia against an armed ethnic Albanian group in the Šar Mountains of Brodec above Tetovo region with ties to  Albanian paramilitary of the conflicts in Kosovo (1998–1999), Preševo Valley (2000–2001) and Macedonia (2001). The operation was carried out to remove and destroy the Albanian terrorist-extremist criminal groups that came from Kosovo, which threatened to destroy peace and stability in the Republic of Macedonia .

Background
In 2007, armed Albanian opposition groups effectively controlled areas near the border with Kosovo. On 10 September an ethnic Albanian police commander and two police officers were wounded in Vaksince during an attempted arrest of Skender Halili and Xheladin Hiseni, two ethnic Albanians that were killed.

The Jakupi group escaped from the Dubrava prison in August with the help of "certain structures", in order to destabilize the region "should the Kosovo negotiations go in a direction these structures do not favor.", according to Security services. On 1 November one of the escapees, Xhavit Morina, former commander of Albanian National Army (AKSH), was killed by unknown perpetrators near Tetovo. Jakupi, the leader, was wanted in Macedonia for launching a rocket at a police station, killing a taxi driver, and wounding three police officers, as well as for putting the village of Volkovo under siege and threatening to bomb Skopje. Members of the criminal "Jakupi group" had participated in the Kosovo War (1998–1999), Insurgency in the Preševo Valley (2000–2001) and Insurgency in the Republic of Macedonia (2001); Jakupi, born in Bujanovac, is wanted in Serbia for several criminal acts.

Operation
The group was headed by Ramadan Shiti and Lirim Jakupi (known as "The Nazi"), Wahhabi extremists and paramilitary who escaped from the Dubrava prison in Kosovo in August. Some in the group, such as Shiti, had previously been linked with a Saudi-backed Wahhabi Muslim sect's attempts to take control over the Islamic communities in Macedonia and Kosovo. The Operation was carried out by a multi-ethnic Special police force in the villages of Brodec, Vešala and Vejce, near Tetovo, beginning in the morning. The criminal group was defeated, and all police officers that participated in the operation were unharmed.

6 people were killed and 13 arrested, among them Habit Ahmeti, another leader of the criminal group. The detained men were beaten, according to witnesses, and Amnesty International expressed concerns at possible excessive use of force by the Macedonian authorities in the operation. An internal investigation by the Macedonian Ministry of Interior concluded that the use of firearms by the police was "appropriate, proportionate, justified and necessary", and that the detainees had been injured while resisting arrest. Heavy weapons and ammunition were confiscated.

Meanwhile, KFOR had increased its troop level in Kosovo, since the start of the operation.

A Macedonian helicopter was allegedly shot down during the clashes; KFOR claims that a helicopter was shot down in the area, while Skopje denied the reports.

Lirim Jakupi escaped the scene with a wound, and was later arrested in September 2010, in an apartment in Pristina, Kosovo, together with grenades and weapons, by the Kosovo police.

See also
2012 Republic of Macedonia inter-ethnic violence

References

Albanian nationalism in North Macedonia
Wahhabists
2007 in the Republic of Macedonia
2007 crimes in the Republic of Macedonia
Conflicts in 2007
Tetovo Municipality
Islamic terrorism in North Macedonia
Terrorism in North Macedonia
Islamism in Kosovo
Police raids on Islamists
Albanian separatism
Battles in 2007